Robert L. "Bubbles" Hawkins (June 30, 1954 – November 28, 1993) was an American professional basketball player. He was drafted 51st overall in the 1975 NBA draft by the Golden State Warriors. Hawkins played for four teams during four seasons in the National Basketball Association, averaging 12.7 points per game, 1.5 assists per game and 2.3 rebounds per game.

Personal
He was married to Barbara Hawkins, and had two sons, Robert Hawkins and Nathan Hawkins

Professional career
Hawkins was drafted in the third round, 51st overall, by the Golden State Warriors in the 1975 NBA draft. He appeared in 32 games for the Warriors in his rookie season, averaging 3.9 points and 0.9 rebounds in only 4.8 minutes per game. He was released by the Warriors the day before the 1976–77 season began, and after being unable to land a roster spot with another team, was prepared to look for a job in a different industry. In December he was contacted by the New York Nets, in the middle of a disastrous first season in the NBA following the ABA–NBA merger. The Nets had been left short at the guard position following the sale of superstar Julius Erving due to financial difficulties. Hawkins quickly became the closest thing the Nets had to a star, averaging 19.3 points per game and leading Nets head coach Kevin Loughery to remark "All I know is that Bubbles Hawkins has become a hero just when we needed one." That year, on February 7, 1977, Hawkins scored a career best 44 points in a 93–89 win over the New Orleans Jazz. During the festivities of the 1977 NBA All-Star Game, Hawkins faced and lost to Pete Maravich in the first round of an NBA-sanctioned game of horse as part of a televised tournament.

However, Hawkins' NBA prominence would be relatively short lived, and Loughery's high opinion of Hawkins was not extended to the 1977–78 season, with the Nets now playing in New Jersey. Hawkins would play in only 15 games for the Nets that season, before being released after a series of conflicts with the coach. Hawkins would get one more chance in the NBA, signing before the 1978–79 season with the Detroit Pistons, but only appeared in four of the team's first nine games before again being released.

Death
On November 28, 1993, Hawkins was found shot to death in what police said was a suspected crack house in Detroit. No arrests were ever made.

References

1954 births
1993 deaths
1993 murders in the United States
African-American basketball players
American men's basketball players
Basketball players from Detroit
Deaths by firearm in Michigan
Detroit Pistons players
Golden State Warriors draft picks
Golden State Warriors players
Illinois State Redbirds men's basketball players
Male murder victims
Murdered African-American people
New Jersey Nets players
New York Nets players
People murdered in Michigan
Shooting guards
Pershing High School alumni
20th-century African-American sportspeople